Sri Guru Ram Das Ji International Airport  is an international airport serving Amritsar, Punjab, India. It is located at Raja Sansi, 11 km (7 mi) north-west from the city centre. It is named after Guru Ram Das, the fourth Sikh Guru and the founder of Amritsar. The airport is the largest and the busiest airport of Punjab. It is the second-largest airport in Northern India after Indira Gandhi International Airport in Delhi. The airport was the 3rd fastest-growing airport in India during the fiscal year 2017–18. It is a hub of cargo movements, domestically and internationally. The airport is ranked the 6th-best regional airport in India and Central Asia in 2019 and 2020 by Skytrax. The airport is awarded as the best airport in Asia-Pacific in 2020 (2 to 5 million passengers per annum) by Airports Council International.

History
In 1930, the airport was established during the British era, and was used for VVIP movements. After independence, it got connected with  Delhi and Srinagar. The first international flight to Kabul was launched in 1960. In January 1982, Air India started a flight from Bombay (now Mumbai) to Birmingham with stops in Delhi and Moscow. The service linked the large North Indian population in the West Midlands to its homeland and was operated by Boeing 707s. However, the airline terminated it in October 1984 amid the Punjab insurgency.

Using Boeing 777 aircraft, Air India operated services to Toronto via Birmingham in May 2005. The stopover changed to London in 2008. Two years later, however, the carrier replaced the route with a direct flight from its Delhi hub to Toronto. In November 2010, the airport's name was changed to Sri Guru Ram Dass Jee International Airport. The following October, British Midland International (BMI) launched a connection to London via Almaty with an Airbus A330 aircraft. Nevertheless, the flight was discontinued in October 2012 as a consequence of the merger between BMI and British Airways. Air India resumed nonstop services to Birmingham in February 2018, this time using Boeing 787s. The airport is now connected with Rome, Milan, Tbilisi (as a stopover), Bangkok, Kuala Lumpur, Singapore, Sharjah, Tashkent, Dubai, Doha and Malé as a seasonal route.

Facilities

In July 2001, the construction of the first phase of the terminal building started, along with the extension of the existing runway, construction of a new Air Traffic Control (ATC) tower and other works. The construction of all Phase-1 works was completed in June 2006. The arrivals section of the terminal building was inaugurated in September 2005, and the departures section was made operational in March 2006. Over the years, the old terminals (existing and Phase-1) were systematically razed, paving way for a new integrated terminal building (Phase-2). The integrated building is a blend of modern and Indian designs, constructed in glass and steel with Indian style arches and colours. In June 2016, the airport registered a 59.6% growth of international passenger traffic.

The integrated terminal building has four aerobridges, an annual capacity of 2.5 million passengers with a peak hour capacity of 1,200 passengers. It has 30 check-in counters, 4 X-ray scanners (for baggage), 26 immigration counters, 10 custom counters, 12 security check booths, and 4 conveyor belts for arrivals. The apron has been extended to cater for parking of a total of 25 aircraft (8 Category 'E', 3 Category 'D' and 13 Category 'C' types of aircraft & 1 category 'E' for cargo) from the earlier capacity of 15 aircraft and strengthened for parking of Category 'C' type of aircraft. An additional apron has also been constructed in between the taxiway and the runway. The departure and arrival halls operate duty-free shops, foreign currency exchange service, restaurants and other shops for the convenience of departing passengers. The airport registered India's highest passenger growth of over 48% for the year 2017–2018. Currently, flights coming in the airport connect it directly to over 20 destinations across India and other countries.

Terminal

The airport is spread over an area of 40,000 sq.m., with 30 check-in counters, 26 immigration counters, 12 custom counters, and 2 security check booths, and can handle 600 passengers at arrivals and 600 passengers at departures. It has the capacity to serve more than 2.5 million passengers per year.

Runway
The airport's runway is equipped with CAT III-B ILS, which makes the airport suitable for aircraft landing in poor weather conditions and visibility. It was installed in 2016-17, when the runway underwent a mass upgrade, at a cost of ₹ 150 crore, and in October 2017, the Airports Authority of India (AAI) issued Low Visibility Procedures (LVP), thus allowing landing at within 50 m visual range. Before the installation of CAT III ILS, CAT II ILS was installed in December 2011 and reduced the visibility requirement for an aircraft landing at the airport on Runway 34, from the existing 650 metres to 350 metres, thus benefiting airlines in increased safety and avoiding diversions to other airports, resulting in better operational and environmental efficiencies.

Airlines and destinations 

Notes:

: SpiceJet flights between Amritsar and Bergamo/Rome Fiumicino (in both directions) make a stop in Tbilisi. However, the airline does not have traffic rights to transport passengers solely between Amritsar and Tbilisi.

Statistics

Future plans
To stimulate the growing demands and future traffic, the Ministry of Civil Aviation has proposed to expand the current integrated passenger terminal at a cost of ₹ 240 crore, which will increase the existing handling capacity of 2.5 million passengers per year to 5.5 million passengers per year. Along with this, an additional ₹ 60 crore were invested for the construction of another apron, taxiways and upgrading of the terminal, which are now completed. 
 
The airport is also proposed to be leased out for privatization on a Public Private Partnership (PPP) basis, along with 5 other major airports operated by the Airports Authority of India (AAI). With privatization, the infrastructure at the airport is expected to rapidly improve further.
 
With the completion of the under-construction Delhi–Amritsar–Katra Expressway, the travel time from Amritsar to Delhi Airport will be cut in half from the current over 8 hours to about 4 hours. This may result in reduction in passenger growth on this route, but will give better road connectivity between the city and the National Capital.

Connectivity

Road
The airport is connected by 4-lane National Highway 354, which runs from Amritsar to Ajnala. Taxis can be taken from the taxi stand at the airport. Both Ola Cabs and Uber are available in the city. Auto rickshaws and local buses also connect the city to the airport. The under-construction Delhi—Amritsar—Katra Expressway will have the first branch from Delhi to the airport, and the second branch to Katra in Jammu and Kashmir, which will improve the connectivity further.

Metrobus
The airport is connected by Route 501 of Amritsar Metrobus, which connects it directly to Amritsar Junction, Golden Temple and many other locations in the network of Amritsar Metrobus. It operates at a frequency of every 10–15 minutes.

See also
 Aviation in India
 Golden Temple
 Amritsar Metrobus
 Amritsar Ring Road
 List of airports in India
 List of the busiest airports in India

References

External links

Transport in Amritsar
Airports in Punjab, India
International airports in India
Buildings and structures in Amritsar
Science and technology in Amritsar
2006 establishments in Punjab, India
Airports established in 2006